La Puente Valley Women's Club is a women's club building located in the La Puente Downtown Business District of La Puente, in eastern Los Angeles County, California.

Architecture
The  wooden building was designed by Charles S. Lee in the Craftsman Bungalow style. It was completed in 1923.

The La Puente Valley Woman's Club building was listed in the National Register of Historic Places in 1999.

See also

List of women's club buildings
National Register of Historic Places listings in Los Angeles County, California

References

Women's club buildings in California
La Puente, California
Clubs and societies in California
Women's clubs in the United States
Buildings and structures completed in 1923
Buildings and structures on the National Register of Historic Places in Los Angeles County, California
Clubhouses on the National Register of Historic Places in Los Angeles
History of women in California
American Craftsman architecture in California
Bungalow architecture in California